Lorane may refer to:

Lorane, Georgia
Lorane, Indiana
Lorane, Oregon
Lorane, Pennsylvania

See also
Lorraine (disambiguation)